The Liberal Democrats (LIDE) is a centrist to centre-left Slovenian political party. It was founded on 12 January 2022 by the then president of the National Assembly of Slovenia, Igor Zorčič.

History 
On March 26, 2021, Igor Zorčič, president of the National Assembly of the Republic of Slovenia, with MPs Janja Sluga and Branislav Rajić withdrew from the Modern Centre Party and co-founded a parliamentary group of unaffiliated deputies. Since then, possible transfers to other parties have been mentioned several times. At the end of 2021, Zorčič announced a new liberal political party.

The inaugural congress took place on Wednesday, 12 January  2022, in Ljubljana. Igor Zorčič was elected president, but at the time of its establishment it was determined that there could be a maximum of three presidents at a time. They also set out the party's abstract program.

On 15 February 2022, the leadership of the Democratic Party of Pensioners of Slovenia (DeSUS) supported a joint participation in the 2022 parliamentary election with the LIDE party.

Party leadership 

 Chairman: Igor Zorčič
 Party Council: Štefan Skalar, Ivan Backovič, Eva Omerza, Marko Veselič, Stanko Tomše, Andrejka Ribnikar, Aleksander Pahor, Roman Dobnikar, David Dremelj, Lana Gobec

References 

Liberal parties in Slovenia
Political parties established in 2022